King Parker House is a historic home located near Winton, Hertford County, North Carolina. It was  built about 1850, and is a two-story, three-bay, single-pile vernacular Greek Revival style frame dwelling. It has a low-pitched, side-gable roof and front portico with vernacular Italianate fretwork. The house encompasses an 18th-century, one-room, -story, gable-roofed building.

It was listed on the National Register of Historic Places in 2002.

References

Houses on the National Register of Historic Places in North Carolina
Greek Revival houses in North Carolina
Houses completed in 1850
Houses in Hertford County, North Carolina
National Register of Historic Places in Hertford County, North Carolina